John Gally Knight ( – 20 October 1804) was an English barrister who served in the House of Commons from 1784 to 1796.

He was the eldest son of Rev. Henry Gally, rector of St. Giles-in-the Fields, Holborn, Middlesex and educated at Eton College (1753–57) and Trinity Hall, Cambridge (1757), where he was awarded LLB in 1764 and elected fellow in 1764. He trained in the law at Lincoln's Inn (1756) and was called to the bar in 1765.

He was elected as a Member of Parliament (MP) for Aldborough at a by-election in January 1784, and held the seat until the 1796 general election, which he did not contest.

He was born John Gally, but adopted the Knight name and arms in 1768 on inheriting substantial properties from his mother Elizabeth, sole heiress of the Knight family of Warsop, Firbeck and elsewhere. He inherited Firbeck Hall in Rotherham, which served as his seat. 

He was unmarried. His estate descended via his brother to his nephew Henry Gally Knight, himself later an MP for Aldborough.

References 

 

1740s births
1804 deaths
Alumni of Trinity Hall, Cambridge
People educated at Eton College
Members of the Parliament of Great Britain for English constituencies
British MPs 1780–1784
British MPs 1784–1790
British MPs 1790–1796
High Sheriffs of Nottinghamshire
People from the Metropolitan Borough of Rotherham
English barristers